A bust of Carl Legien is installed along Legiendamm in Kreuzberg, Berlin, Germany.

External links

 

Busts in Germany
Friedrichshain-Kreuzberg
Monuments and memorials in Berlin
Outdoor sculptures in Berlin
Sculptures of men in Germany